Baitul Makmur Meulaboh Grand Mosque is the largest mosque in the western coast of Meulaboh, Aceh, Indonesia.

Architecture 

The mosque has an architectural style of combination between Arabic, Indian and Acehnese as well as a selection of bright brown colors combined with red brick on the dome of the mosque.
Main characteristers of the mosque are three main domes flanked by two water tower domes of smaller size. The head shapes of all the domes are the similarly rounded and has pointed end, typical of Islamic architecture with the Middle Eastern and Asian blend.Baitul Makmur Great Mosque . www.duniamasjid.com. Retrieved 23 July 2012 This mosque will be equipped with two new towers which is still under construction as of 2012. The inspiration of the Middle Eastern architectural style is also evident from the form of mihrab. The mihrab is dominated by brown color and shades of gold typical of bronze material with Islamic special ornaments.

The combination of the architectural characteristics has made the Great Mosque of Baitul Makmur Meulaboh entered into the 100 Most Beautiful Mosque in Indonesia, a book compiled by Teddy Tjokrosaputro & Aryananda Published by PT Andalan Media, August 2011. Masjid Agung Meulaboh Login 100 The Most Beautiful Mosque. Www.aceh.tribunnews.com. Retrieved 23 July 2012

See also 
 Islam in Indonesia
 List of mosques in Indonesia

References 

Buildings and structures in Banda Aceh
Cultural Properties of Indonesia in Aceh
Islam in Aceh
Mosques completed in 1999
Mosques in Aceh
Tourist attractions in Aceh
1999 establishments in Indonesia